Jeric is a given name. Notable people with the name include:

 Jeric Fortuna (born 1991), Filipino basketball player
 Jeric Gonzales (born 1992), Filipino TV personality
 Jeric T (born 1986), Singaporean singer-songwriter
 Jeric Teng (born 1991), Filipino basketball player

See also
 Jeri